The 2000 Primera B de Chile was the 50th completed season of the Primera B de Chile.

Table

See also
Chilean football league system

References

External links
 RSSSF 2000

Primera B de Chile seasons
Primera B
Chil